Carrowkeel may refer to the following places in Ireland:
 Carrowkeel, County Galway, townland
 Carrowkeel Megalithic Cemetery, County Sligo
 Kerrykeel, known as Carrowkeel in census returns, in County Donegal